Jemadia is a Neotropical genus of firetips in the family Hesperiidae.

A very comprehensive genus, in which it is rather difficult to define the species owing to the extraordinary resemblance among one another. Moreover, there are two series parallel to each other, one of which shows four white dots on the prothorax, the other exhibiting a white transverse streak instead. In order to facilitate the definition we keep to Mabille's division of the groups into "punctati" and "lineati". The Jemadia are robust insects with white or blue marking and hyaline (glass-like) spots. The hindwings are often remarkably small, in the males often with tooth-like projections on the inner-marginal and lower median vein, above them mostly with a deeply concave excision, and between the upper radial and subcostal vein often with an obtuse projection; more rarely the hindwings are quite round. The middle radial vein is absent, the lower one comes from the lower cell-angle, the upper median vein below it separately.

List of species
Jemadia fallax (Mabille, 1878) - fallax skipper - type locality Brazil
Jemadia fallax fallax (Mabille, 1878) Guianas, north Brazil 
Jemadia fallax fiska Evans, 1951 Colombia
Jemadia fallax fida Evans, 1951 Ecuador, Peru, Bolivia
Jemadia fallax solaris Hayward, 1942 Colombia, Venezuela, Guyana, north Brazil, east Peru, Bolivia 
Jemadia gnetus (Fabricius, 1781) - gnetus skipper - Suriname, Guyana, Venezuela, Colombia, Ecuador, Peru, Bolivia, south Brazil 
Jemadia brevipennis Schaus, 1902 - brevipennis skipper - Brazil, Paraguay 
Jemadia hospita (Butler, 1877) - hospita skipper - type locality Peru
Jemadia hospita hospita (A. Butler, 1877) south Colombia, Ecuador, Peru, Bolivia, west Brazil
Jemadia hospita imitator (Mabille, 1891) Colombia 
Jemadia hospita hephaestos (Plötz, 1879) Suriname 
Jemadia pseudognetus (Mabille, 1878) - dot-collared skipper - southeast Mexico to Venezuela and upper Amazon 
Jemadia hewitsonii (Mabille, 1878) - Hewitson's skipper - type locality Brazil (Amazonas)
Jemadia hewitsonii hewitsonii  (Mabille, 1878) French Guiana, Venezuela (Amazonas, Bolivar), north Brazil, Peru 
Jemadia hewitsonii ovid Evans, 1951 Colombia, Ecuador 
Jemadia hewitsonii albescens Röber, 1925 Ecuador, Peru, Bolivia 
Jemadia menechmus (Mabille, 1878) - Menechmus skipper 
Jemadia menechmus menechmus (Mabille, 1878) Suriname, Venezuela, Colombia, Ecuador, Peru, Bolivia, north and west Brazil 
Jemadia menechmus desousai Orellana, [2010] Venezuela (Amazonas) 
Jemadia pater Evans, 1951 - pater skipper - Panama, Colombia, Venezuela 
Jemadia scomber Druce, 1908 - mammoth skipper - Peru 
Jemadia sosia (Mabille, 1878) - sosia skipper - southwest Venezuela, Colombia, Ecuador, Peru, Bolivia 
Jemadia demarmelsi Orellana, [2010] - Demarmels' skipper - Venezuela

References

Funet
Natural History Museum Lepidoptera genus database

External links

images representing Jemadia at Consortium for the Barcode of Life

Hesperiidae
Hesperiidae of South America
Hesperiidae genera
Taxa named by Edward Yerbury Watson